Dr. Lila Gogoi was a writer, educationist and historian. He was the H. O. D.  of Assamese department, Dibrugarh University and Honorary Director, Department of Historical and Antiquarian Studies in Assam. He was also the President of Assam Sahitya Sabha in the session of 1994.

Works

Literature: Sontara (1954), Khara Shiyalor Biya (1954), Ponakanar Sapon (1955), Horogor Mukuta (1957), Dokait Kon (1957), Kopling Siga Rail (1959), Rangmanor Katha (1963), Nilakhamor Sithi (1963), Beybering Chithi (1976), Brikudar Baruar Biya (1977, 1978), Bishes Ki Likhim (1978), Ghergheri Bus (1981), Bihugeet aru banghosha, Giti Malanca(1964), Asamiya Loka-sahityar Ruprekha (1968).

Historical: Buranjiye Parasha Nagar (1957), Herua Dinor Kotha (1957), Lachit Borphukan (1960), Ahom Jati aru Asamiya Sanskriti (1961), Simantar Mati aru Manuh (1963), Sahitya-sanskritir Buranji (1972), Asamor Sanskriti (1982),
 The Buranjis, historical literature of Assam:a critical survey(1986), The Tai Khamtis(1971), The Tai Khamtis of the North East(1990), The History of the system of Ahom Administration(1991), Beli Maar Gol(1983), Buranjiye Katha Koi(1991)

Monuments
A hostel of Dibrugarh University is dedicated to Dr. Lila Gogoi. The name of the hostel is 'Leela Gogoi Memorial Gobeshak Chatra Nivas'.

Notes

References
 Gogoi Lila Dr., Asamar Sanskriti, published by Banalata, Dibrugarh, Assam in 2017

Asom Sahitya Sabha Presidents
Writers from Assam
Writers from Northeast India
Assamese novels
Dibrugarh University
Assamese literature
20th-century Indian male writers
1930 births
1994 deaths
20th-century Indian historians
Indian editors